5TEARS Vol. 3 ~Sweet Dragon~ is the third EP released by Eiko Shimamiya in her 5Tears series. While the previous two consists songs by multiple singers, this edition features Eiko Shimamiya as the vocalist for all the songs.

Track listing

Sweet Dragon
Composition/Arrangement: Yukihiro Shinkai
Lyric/Melody: Eiko Shimamiya
Control
Composition/Arrangement: Maiko Iuchi
Lyric: Eiko Shimamiya
 (あの丘はじまりの鐘)
Composition/Arrangement: Bermei. Inazawa
Lyric/Melody: Eiko Shimamiya
survivors note
Composition/Arrangement: TAKUYA
Lyrics: Eiko Shimamiya
Yukiotoko (雪男)
Composition/Arrangement: MANYO
Lyric: Eiko Shimamiya
new song
Composition/Lyric: Eiko Shimamiya
Arrangement: green

References

J-pop EPs
2013 EPs
Eiko Shimamiya albums